Brett Tamburrino (born 10 November 1981) is an Australian baseballer with the Melbourne Aces. In 2004, he was part of the Australian Olympic baseball team, who achieved a Silver Medal in the baseball tournament at the Athens Olympics.

Tamburrino is playing for the Aces in their inaugural 2010–11 season.

References

1981 births
Living people
Australian baseball players
Baseball players at the 2004 Summer Olympics
Olympic baseball players of Australia
Olympic silver medalists for Australia
Olympic medalists in baseball
Medalists at the 2004 Summer Olympics
Melbourne Aces players